The Austefjorden is a small fjord which branches off of the main Voldsfjorden in Volda Municipality in Møre og Romsdal county, Norway. The Austefjorden and the Kilsfjorden join together to form the Voldsfjorden. The village of Fyrde is located at the innermost part of the fjord. There are several small peninsulas and outcroppings that jut out into the fjord, giving the fjord a meandering S-shaped path.

See also
 List of Norwegian fjords

References

Fjords of Møre og Romsdal
Volda
Sunnmøre